Manson Guitar Works is a British guitar and bass manufacturer based in Devon, England. Initially focussed on one-off, customised instruments, Manson Guitar Works has since extended its range of products into bass guitars, accessories, and, after forming a relationship with Cort, has recently launched more affordable ranges.

History 
The company was started by Hugh Manson after following in his brother's footsteps in the guitar building scene, specialising in electric guitars. After moving from Crowborough to Exeter, Manson set up Mansons Guitar Shop alongside Adrian Ashton and Jay Henson. The company separated from the guitar shop in to avoid confusion. In 2019, long-time Manson player Matt Bellamy of Muse bought a majority share in the company.

In 2023, Bellamy revealed that the company is working on a line of pedals as well as more affordable instruments and more integrated effects, hinting at potential collaborations with DigiTech.

Instruments

Bass guitars 
The E-Bass was originally conceived as a one-off for Adrian Ashton, but soon caught the attention of Led Zeppelin's John Paul Jones. The John Paul Jones signature is a slightly modified version of the Manson E-Bass. Manson has also produced custom basses for Mike Kerr, Chris Wolstenholme and Matt Bellamy.

Matt Bellamy signature guitars 
Since the early 2000s, Matt Bellamy of Muse has worked with Manson Guitar Works to create his electric guitars. They have released several "M-series" signature models. In 2019, Bellamy purchased a majority stake in Manson.

The early years Muse were based in their hometown of Teignmouth, and the band sourced much of their equipment from Mansons Guitar Shop in Exeter. After the release of Showbiz in 1999, Bellamy had the funds to purchase his first Manson guitar — a 7-string that is most notably played in the song "Citizen Erased" —and ordered a customised guitar known as the 'De Lorean', after the time machine in Back to the Future. The guitar's shape was inspired by a Fender Telecaster and Bellamy's previous Yamaha Pacifica, featuring custom electronics which allowed for the integration of a ZVEX Fuzz Factory and MXR Phase 90 and a custom aluminium finish.

MIDI integration is the next phase of Manson and Bellamy's innovation with the instrument, first seen in the guitar dubbed the "Manson 007" in 2001, which Bellamy still uses in studio recordings. The release of the 2006 album Black Holes and Revelations and the subsequent tour saw the debut of the M1D1, a guitar that featured larger in built MIDI compatability which allowed Bellamy to control a Korg Kaoss pad from his guitar.

After the formation of the Beatles tribute the Jaded Hearts Club, Bellamy purchased a Höfner bass. By the time the group extended their repertoire and released the singles from the debut cover album, Bellamy had acquired a custom Manson violin bass with integrated LEDs. This bass is featured in their music videos and was most recently used in their 2022/23 New Years Eve concert.

Bellamy's signature models have also been manufactured by Cort, first as the MBC model and now as the MBM. The latest MBM-2 models feature either a P-90 pickup or a Sustainiac in the neck position.

The newly dubbed "Manson S-type" debuted on the Will of the People tour and is used in the performance of the song Verona.

References